Savannah Arts Academy (SAA) is the first dedicated performing and visual arts school in Savannah, Georgia, United States. It is part of the Savannah-Chatham County Public Schools. Savannah Arts Academy was granted charter school status and the former Savannah High School building in July 1998, and opened in August of the same year with 397 students enrolled.

As of 2023, the school is ranked the #7 high school in Georgia, and #276 high school nationally, ranked by U.S. News & World Report.

History
The Savannah Arts Academy building is located on a site that was originally planned as a luxury tourist hotel called the Hotel Georgia. The Works Progress Administration, in the midst of the Great Depression, expressed interest in the site for use as the new Savannah High School, which was dedicated on June 15, 1937. After 61 years on Washington Avenue, Savannah High School classes were moved to a new building on Pennsylvania Avenue, leaving the structure available for the newly formed Savannah Arts Academy for the school year beginning August 1998.

Awards and recognition
During the 2006–07 school year, Savannah Arts Academy was recognized with the Blue Ribbon School Award of Excellence by the United States Department of Education. "The Blue Ribbon award is given only to schools that reach the top 10 percent of their state's testing scores over several years or show significant gains in student achievement." Savannah Arts ranks #1 in the city of Savannah for public high schools, ranks #7 in Georgia for public high schools, and ranks in the top 300's in the United States, competing with 24,000 other public high schools.

Student activities

Junk 2 Funk
Junk 2 Funk is an annual fashion show put on by the visual arts and theater departments. Prior to the Covid-19 pandemic, Junk 2 Funk usually consisted of four shows in January; however, in 2021, there were no performances open to the public, and in 2022, one public show was performed as well as one school show.

Notable alumni

References

External links
 

Schools of the performing arts in the United States
Educational institutions established in 1998
Public high schools in Georgia (U.S. state)
Works Progress Administration in Georgia (U.S. state)
Schools in Savannah, Georgia
Magnet schools in Georgia (U.S. state)
Charter schools in Georgia (U.S. state)
1998 establishments in Georgia (U.S. state)
1998 in Georgia (U.S. state)